The flag of the United States Marine Corps (also known as the standard or battle color) is the flag used to represent the U.S. Marine Corps, as well as its subsidiary units and formations.

Design

Official battle color of the U.S. Marine Corps

The official flag is scarlet with the Corps emblem in gray and gold. It was adopted on 18 January 1939, although Marine Corps Order 4 had established scarlet and gold as the official colors of the Corps as early as 1925. The indoor/parade version is bordered by a gold fringe while the outdoor version is plain.

History

Very little information is available regarding the flags carried by early American marines, although indications are that the Grand Union Flag was carried ashore by the battalion led by Captain Samuel Nicholas on New Providence Island, 3 March 1776. It is quite possible that the Gadsden flag was also carried on this expedition.

The standard carried by the Marines during the 1830s and 1840s consisted of a white field with gold fringe, and bore an elaborate design of an anchor and eagle in the center. Prior to the Mexican–American War, this flag bore the legend "To the Shores of Tripoli" across the top. Shortly after the war, the legend was revised to read: "From Tripoli to the Halls of the Montezumas."

During the Mexican and Civil Wars, Marines in the field apparently carried a flag similar to the national flag, consisting of red and white stripes and a union. The union, however, contained an eagle perched on a shield of the United States and a half-wreath beneath the shield, with 29 stars encircling the entire design. Beginning in 1876, Marines carried the national colors (the Stars and Stripes) with "U.S. Marine Corps" embroidered in yellow on the middle red stripe.

At the time of the Vera Cruz landing in 1914, a more distinctive standard was carried by Marines. The design consisted of a blue field with a laurel wreath encircling the Marine Corps emblem in the center. A scarlet ribbon above the emblem carried the words "U.S. Marine Corps," while another scarlet ribbon below the emblem carried the motto "Semper Fidelis."

Orders were issued on 2 April 1921 which directed all national colors be manufactured without the yellow fringe and without the words "U.S. Marine Corps" embroidered on the red stripe. This was followed by an order dated 14 March 1922, retiring from use all national colors still in use with yellow fringe or wording on the flag. Following World War I, the Army practice of attaching silver bands carrying inscriptions enumerating specific decorations and battles was adopted. This practice was discontinued on 23 January 1961.

Marine Corps Order No. 4 of 18 April 1925 designated gold and scarlet as the official colors of the U.S. Marine Corps. These colors, however, were not reflected in the official Marine Corps standard until 18 January 1939, when a new design incorporating the new colors was approved. The design was essentially that of today's Marine Corps standard.

For a brief time following World War I, the inscribing of battle honors directly on the colors of a unit was in practice, but realization that a multiplicity of honors and the limited space on the colors made the system impractical, and the procedure was discontinued. On 29 July 1936, a Marine Corps Board recommended that the Army system of attaching streamers to the staff of the organizational colors be adopted. Such a system was finally authorized by Marine Corps Order No. 157, dated 3 November 1939, and is currently in practice. Devices are embroidered onto the streamer to denote special recognition or repeat awards. Unlike the Army and Air Force flags, only a single streamer is utilized for a single campaign, with the exception of those streamers that require more than eight devices, the maximum any one streamer may hold. Devices are only authorized for campaigns participated in the 20th and 21st centuries.

Color Sergeant
The official battle color of the Corps is maintained by Marine Barracks, Washington, D.C. ("8th and I"), and carried by the Color Sergeant of the Marine Corps. The position of the Color Sergeant was first officially designated in 1965 and was first held by Gunnery Sgt. Shelton L. Eakin. The Color Sergeant of the Marine Corps traditionally carries the Flag of the President of the United States at state dinners and other official functions, and leads the color guard at various parades and ceremonies.

Streamers
The following streamers are authorized, in order of precedence:

 Note that a "x #" designation denotes the number of streamers used to carry devices (maximum of 8), not the number of awards.

Organizational Battle Colors

Each unit in the Corps of battalion-size or larger also hold an organizational color (which makes up the unit's colors along with the national flag). It is usually identical to the Marine Corps battle color, though the scroll will have the unit's name instead of "United States Marine Corps". It will also bear the streamers authorized to the unit, or scarlet and gold tassels if none are authorized.

Each Corps unit has a designated color guard, led by a color sergeant. He is entrusted with the care of the unit colors, which are a symbol of the United States, the Marine Corps, and the commander him/herself. The organizational colors are often passed as part of change of command ceremonies to symbolize the transfer of office. When not in use as part of a parade or ceremony, the colors are traditionally kept in the commander's office.

Guidons

A Marine guidon is always rectangular, with a scarlet field and gold lettering, and an Eagle, Globe, and Anchor centered.

Fleet Marine Forces units have "FMF" emblazoned above an Eagle, Globe, and Anchor (EGA), reserve units display "USMCR", and all others have "USMC". The regimental level numeral will be displayed in the lower left corner, unless a higher or lower command numeral provides better identification (for example, a battalion's headquarters company would display that battalion's numeral instead of the regiment). The company-level designation letter, abbreviated title, or number will be in the lower right corner.

No additional attachments are authorized, including streamers, bands, or the like. Some units incorporate additional banners or mascots into unofficial guidons.

Guidons are used in the same manner as colors for a company- or platoon-sized unit. Much like the colors, the guidon represents the unit commander. It is entrusted to the unit guide for parades and ceremonies, and displayed in or near the commander's office when he or she is present.

Guidons are also used in recruit training to identify individual platoons. First and second phase platoons have a gold background with their four-digit platoon number in scarlet, while third phase platoons have a scarlet background with gold lettering and trim. The guidon is used as an aid to instilling unit identity and pride, representing the platoon. Some drill instructors will test that pride by attempting to dishonor the guidon and expecting the recruits to intervene. Also, the recruit assigned to carry it, the guide, is treated as the most senior recruit of the platoon, and uses the guidon to marks the line of advance in close order drill.

Personal flags
General-grade officers and the Commandant of the Marine Corps are authorized a personal flag, which displays their rank insignia. A red background with white stars are used, while the Commandant also has a grey and gold Eagle, Globe, and Anchor. These flags are often used to mark a command headquarters in garrison, as well as a symbol for the general themself. Much like a guidon, they are displayed when the general is present, and stowed when not; visiting officers and officials often have their personal flags displayed as a courtesy.

Shared aspects

All U.S. Marine flags share a similar wooden staff and silver spearhead and ferrule. The base of the spearhead is used to support streamers or tassels if authorized. Older organizational colors may also have silver bands, awarded for participation in a battle or campaign, though the practice has been discontinued for all but the Corp's main battle colors.

A color mounted on a vehicle of some type is referred to as a standard. When the national flag is flown from a ship, it is referred to as the national ensign.

See also

Color guard
Flags of the United States Armed Forces
Guidon (United States)

References

Text adapted from History of the Marine Corps Flag and Battle Colors of the Marine Corps

External links

Marine Barracks, Washington, D.C.
United States Marine Corps Color Guard and Color Sergeant of the Marine Corps 

Flags displaying animals
Marine Corps
United States Marine Corps lore and symbols